HD 116852, also known as HIP 65890, is a solitary, whitish-blue-hued star located in the southern circumpolar constellation Chamaeleon. It has an apparent magnitude of 8.47, making it readily visible in binoculars but not to the naked eye. At its current distance, HD 116852's brightness is diminished by 0.67 magnitudes due to extinction from interstellar dust. It has an absolute bolometric magnitude of −9.0.

HD 116852 has a stellar classification of O8.5 II-III ((f)), indicating that it is an evolved O-type star with a luminosity class intermediate between a bright giant and a regular giant star. The spectrum also includes a strong He II absorption accompanied by weak N III emissions. It has 15 times the mass of the Sun and 19 times the solar radius. HD 116852 is metal deficient ([Fe/H] = −0.20) and is estimated to be 5 million years old.

There is a cloud of highly ionized gas in the line-of-sight towards HD 116852. It was first noticed by astronomers Kenneth R. Sembach and Blair D. Savage in 1994. The cloud in question contains an overabundance of carbon including other chemical elements such as silicon, phosphorus, nickel, and germanium. HD 116852 has a high galactic latitude, indicating that it is currently in the galactic halo between the Scutum-Centaurus Arm and the Sagittarius-Carina Arm.  It is most likely a runaway star that was ejected from its birthplace into its current location.

References

O-type giants
O-type bright giants
Runaway stars
Chamaeleon (constellation)
CD-78 00545
116852
065890